Raj Ghat is a memorial dedicated to Mahatma Gandhi in Delhi, India. Originally it was the name of a historic ghat of Old Delhi (Shahjahanabad). Close to it, and east of Daryaganj was Raj Ghat Gate of the walled city, opening at Raj Ghat to the west bank of the Yamuna River. Later the memorial area was also called Raj Ghat. It is a black marble platform that marks the spot of Mahatma Gandhi's cremation, Antyeshti (last rites) on 31 January 1948, a day after his assassination. It is left open to the sky while an eternal flame burns at one end. Located on Delhi's Ring Road, officially known as Mahatma Gandhi Road, a stone footpath flanked by lawns leads to the walled enclosure that houses the memorial. The materials used in the memorial, especially in the recesses, raise a few questions about the nature of Gandhian architecture in India. There is a difference between the architecture of Rajghat and a Gandhian low-cost housing architecture. Unlike the hard material faces of some portions of Rajghat, a Gandhian low-cost housing architecture has a decidedly perishable character. In this sense the event of the construction of the Rajghat Memorial belongs within a more hard-modernist Gandhian architectural history in India, distinctly removed from a Gandhian low-cost architectural history of perishable materials.

Other memorials in the Raj Ghat area
Raj Ghat loosely translates to Royal Steps (with "royal" alluding to the importance of the place and "steps" referencing the bank of the Yamuna River). Several other samadhis or cremation spots of other famous leaders can be found in the vicinity of Raj Ghat. The landscaping and planting of these memorials was performed by Alick Percy-Lancaster, the last Englishman to hold the post of Superintendent of Horticultural Operations, Government of India.

Jawaharlal Nehru's samadhi is to the north of the Raj Ghat and is known as the Shantivan meaning the "garden of peace". Adjacent to Nehru's memorial is Ekta Sthal, the site where Zail Singh, 7th President of India, was cremated with full state honours in 2005.

The Raj Ghat area has a park adorned with trees planted by visiting dignitaries and heads of state.

Gallery

References

Sources

Further reading
 Venugopal Maddipati (2020). Gandhi and Architecture: A Time for Low-Cost Housing.

External links

 India official tourism website

Eternal flames
Monuments and memorials in Delhi
Memorials to Mahatma Gandhi
Assassination of Mahatma Gandhi